The following is a list of writers for the television series The West Wing sorted by the number of episodes written. Contributions are noted in parenthesis. Collaborations are noted by dashes.

Aaron Sorkin
 01-01: "Pilot"
 01-02: "Post Hoc, Ergo Propter Hoc"
 01-03: "A Proportional Response"
 01-04: "Five Votes Down" (Teleplay)
 01-05: "The Crackpots and These Women"
 01-06: "Mr. Willis of Ohio"
 01-07: "The State Dinner" — with Paul Redford
 01-09: "The Short List" (Teleplay — with Patrick Caddell / Story — with Dee Dee Myers)
 01-10: "In Excelsis Deo" — with Rick Cleveland
 01-11: "Lord John Marbury" (Teleplay — with Patrick Caddell)
 01-12: "He Shall, from Time to Time..."
 01-13: "Take out the Trash Day"
 01-14: "Take This Sabbath Day" (Teleplay / Story — with Lawrence O'Donnell, Jr. and Paul Redford)
 01-15: "Celestial Navigation" (Teleplay)
 01-16: "20 Hours in L.A."
 01-17: "The White House Pro-Am" — with Lawrence O'Donnell, Jr. and Paul Redford
 01-18: "Six Meetings Before Lunch"
 01-19: "Let Bartlet Be Bartlet" (Teleplay)
 01-20: "Mandatory Minimums"
 01-21: "Lies, Damn Lies and Statistics"
 01-22: "What Kind of Day Has It Been"
 02-01: "In the Shadow of Two Gunmen"
 02-02: "The Midterms"
 02-03: "In This White House" (Teleplay)
 02-04: "And It's Surely to Their Credit" (Teleplay)
 02-05: "The Lame Duck Congress" (Teleplay)
 02-06: "The Portland Trip" (Teleplay)
 02-07: "Shibboleth" (Teleplay)
 02-08: "Galileo" — with Kevin Falls
 02-09: "Noël" (Teleplay)
 02-10: "The Leadership Breakfast" (Teleplay)
 02-11: "The Drop-In" (Teleplay)
 02-12: "Bartlet's Third State of the Union" (Teleplay)
 02-13: "The War at Home"
 02-14: "Ellie" (Teleplay)
 02-15: "Somebody's Going to Emergency, Somebody's Going to Jail" — with Paul Redford
 02-16: "The Stackhouse Filibuster" (Teleplay)
 02-17: "17 People"
 02-18: "Bad Moon Rising" (Teleplay)
 02-19: "The Fall's Gonna Kill You" (Teleplay)
 02-20: "18th and Potomac" (Teleplay)
 02-21: "Two Cathedrals"
 03-01: "Manchester: Part I"
 03-02: "Manchester: Part II"
 03-03: "Ways and Means" (Teleplay)
 03-04: "On the Day Before" (Teleplay)
 03-05: "War Crimes" (Teleplay)
 03-06: "Gone Quiet" (Teleplay)
 03-07: "The Indians in the Lobby" (Teleplay — with Allison Abner and Kevin Falls)
 03-08: "The Women of Qumar" (Teleplay)
 03-09: "Bartlet for America"
 03-10: "H. Con-172" (Teleplay)
 03-11: "100,000 Airplanes"
 03-12: "The Two Bartlets" (Teleplay — with Kevin Falls)
 03-13: "Night Five"
 03-14: "Hartsfield's Landing"
 03-15: "Dead Irish Writers" (Teleplay)
 03-16: "The U.S. Poet Laureate" (Teleplay)
 03-17: "Stirred" (Teleplay — with Eli Attie)
 03-18: "Enemies Foreign and Domestic" — with Paul Redford
 03-19: "The Black Vera Wang"
 03-20: "We Killed Yamamoto"
 03-21: "Posse Comitatus"
 04-01: "20 Hours in America"
 04-02: "College Kids" (Teleplay)
 04-03: "The Red Mass" (Teleplay)
 04-04: "Debate Camp" (Teleplay)
 04-05: "Game On" — with Paul Redford
 04-06: "Election Night" (Teleplay)
 04-07: "Process Stories" (Teleplay)
 04-09: "Arctic Radar" (Teleplay)
 04-10: "Holy Night"
 04-11: "Guns Not Butter" — with Eli Attie and Kevin Falls
 04-13: "Inauguration" (Teleplay)
 04-14: "Inauguration: Over There" (Teleplay)
 04-15: "The California 47th" (Teleplay)
 04-16: "Red Haven's on Fire" (Teleplay)
 04-17: "Privateers" (Teleplay — with Paul Redford and Debora Cahn)
 04-18: "Angel Maintenance" (Teleplay — with Eli Attie)
 04-19: "Evidence of Things Not Seen" (Teleplay)
 04-20: "Life on Mars" (Teleplay)
 04-21: "Commencement"
 04-22: "Twenty Five"

Eli Attie
 03-03: "Ways and Means" (Story — with Gene Sperling)
 03-10: "H. Con-172" (Story)
 03-17: "Stirred" (Teleplay — with Aaron Sorkin)
 04-03: "The Red Mass" (Story)
 04-08: "Swiss Diplomacy" — with Kevin Falls
 04-11: "Guns Not Butter" — with Kevin Falls and Aaron Sorkin
 04-18: "Angel Maintenance" (Teleplay — with Aaron Sorkin / Story — with Kevin Falls)
 04-19: "Evidence of Things Not Seen" (Story — with David Handelman)
 05-05: "Constituency of One" (Teleplay / Story — with Michael Oates Palmer)
 05-12: "Slow News Day"
 05-19: "Talking Points"
 06-03: "Third-Day Story"
 06-11: "Opposition Research"
 06-15: "Freedonia"
 06-18: "La Palabra"
 07-02: "The Mommy Problem"
 07-06: "The Al Smith Dinner"
 07-12: "Duck and Cover"
 07-17: "Election Day Part II" — with John Wells
 07-18: "Requiem" — with Debora Cahn and John Wells

Lawrence O'Donnell, Jr.
 01-04: "Five Votes Down" (Story — with Patrick Caddell)
 01-08: "Enemies" (Story — with Rick Cleveland and Patrick Caddell)
 01-11: "Lord John Marbury" (Story — with Patrick Caddell)
 01-14: "Take This Sabbath Day" (Story — with Patrick Caddell and Aaron Sorkin)
 01-15: "Celestial Navigation" (Story — with Dee Dee Myers)
 01-17: "The White House Pro-Am" — with Paul Redford and Aaron Sorkin
 02-05: "The Lame Duck Congress" (Story)
 02-11: "The Drop-In" (Story)
 02-20: "18th and Potomac" (Story)
 05-15: "Full Disclosure"
 06-08: "In the Room"
 06-20: "In God We Trust"
 07-03: "Message of the Week"
 07-07: "The Debate"
 07-14: "Two Weeks Out"
 07-20: "The Last Hurrah"

Debora Cahn
 04-02: "College Kids" (Story — with Mark Goffman)
 04-16: "Red Haven's on Fire" (Story — with Mark Goffman)
 04-17: "Privateers" (Teleplay — with Paul Redford and Aaron Sorkin / Story — with Paul Redford)
 05-03: "Jefferson Lives" (Story — with Carol Fint)
 05-09: "Abu el Banat"
 05-17: "The Supremes"
 05-20: "No Exit" (Teleplay — with Carol Flint)
 06-04: "Liftoff"
 06-09: "Impact Winter"
 06-16: "Drought Conditions"
 07-01: "The Ticket"
 07-08: "Undecideds"
 07-13: "The Cold" (Teleplay / Story — with Lauren Schmidt)
 07-18: "Requiem" — with Eli Attie and John Wells
 07-21: "Institutional Memory"

Paul Redford
 01-07: "The State Dinner" — with Aaron Sorkin
 01-14: "Take This Sabbath Day" (Story — with Lawrence O'Donnell, Jr. and Aaron Sorkin)
 01-17: "The White House Pro-Am" — with Lawrence O'Donnell, Jr. and Aaron Sorkin
 02-06: "The Portland Trip" (Story)
 02-10: "The Leadership Breakfast" (Story)
 02-15: "Somebody's Going to Emergency, Somebody's Going to Jail" — with Aaron Sorkin
 03-04: "On the Day Before" (Story — with Nanda Chitre)
 03-15: "Dead Irish Writers" (Story)
 03-18: "Enemies Foreign and Domestic" — with Aaron Sorkin
 04-05: "Game On"
 04-17: "Privateers" (Teleplay — with Debora Cahn and Aaron Sorkin / Story — with Debora Cahn)
 04-20: "Life on Mars" (Story — with Dee Dee Myers)
 05-07: "Separation of Powers"

John Wells
 05-01: "7A WF 83429"
 05-02: "The Dogs of War"
 05-14: "An Khe"
 06-01: "NSF Thurmont"
 06-02: "The Birnam Wood"
 06-13: "King Corn"
 06-22: "2162 Votes"
 07-17: "Election Day Part II" — with Eli Attie
 07-18: "Requiem" — with Eli Attie and Debora Cahn
 07-22: "Tomorrow"

Kevin Falls
 02-04: "And It's Surely to Their Credit" (Story — with Laura Glasser)
 02-08: "Galileo" — with Aaron Sorkin
 02-14: "Ellie" (Story — with Laura Glasser)
 03-07: "The Indians in the Lobby" (Teleplay — with Allison Abner and Aaron Sorkin)
 03-12: "The Two Bartlets" (Teleplay — with Aaron Sorkin)
 04-08: "Swiss Diplomacy" — with Eli Attie
 04-11: "Guns Not Butter" — with Eli Attie and Aaron Sorkin
 04-18: "Angel Maintenance" (Story— with Eli Attie)

Peter Noah
 05-04: "Han" (Teleplay / Story — with Mark Goffman and Paula Yoo)
 05-13: "The Warfare of Genghis Khan"
 05-21: "Gaza"
 06-05: "The Hubbert Peak"
 06-21: "Things Fall Apart"
 07-05: "Here Today"
 07-10: "Running Mates"
 07-19: "Transition"

Patrick Caddell
 01-04: "Five Votes Down" (Story — with Lawrence O'Donnell, Jr.)
 01-08: "Enemies" (Story — with Rick Cleveland and Lawrence O'Donnell, Jr.)
 01-09: "The Short List" (Teleplay — with Aaron Sorkin)
 01-11: "Lord John Marbury" (Teleplay — with Aaron Sorkin / Story — with Lawrence O'Donnell, Jr.)
 01-19: "Let Bartlet Be Bartlet" (Story — with Peter Parnell)
 02-07: "Shibboleth" (Story)
 02-19: "The Fall's Gonna Kill You" (Story)

Mark Goffman
 04-02: "College Kids" (Story — with Debora Cahn)
 04-16: "Red Haven's on Fire" (Story — with Debora Cahn)
 05-04: "Han" (Story — with Peter Noah and Paula Yoo)
 05-08: "Shutdown"
 05-20: "No Exit" (Story — with Carol Flint)
 06-12: "365 Days"

Lauren Schmidt
 04-08: "Process Stories" (Story — with Paula Yoo)
 04-15: "The California 47th" (Story — with Paula Yoo)
 05-06: "Disaster Relief" (Story — with Alexa Junge)
 05-18: "Access"
 07-13: "The Cold" (Story — with Debora Cahn)
 07-16: "Election Day"

Josh Singer
 05-10: "The Stormy Present" (Story — with John Sacret Young)
 05-22: "Memorial Day" — with John Sacret Young
 06-07: "A Change is Gonna Come" (Teleplay — with John Sacret Young)
 06-14: "The Wake Up Call"
 07-09: "The Wedding"
 07-15: "Welcome to Wherever You Are"

Dee Dee Myers
 01-09: "The Short List" (Story — with Aaron Sorkin)
 01-15: "Celestial Navigation" (Story — with Lawrence O'Donnell, Jr.)
 02-12: "Bartlet's Third State of the Union" (Story — with Allison Abner)
 03-17: "Stirred" (Story)
 03-20: "Life on Mars" (Story — with Paul Redford)

Laura Glasser
 02-04: "And It's Surely to Their Credit" (Story — with Kevin Falls)
 02-14: "Ellie" (Story — with Kevin Falls)
 03-06: "Gone Quiet" (Story — with Julia Dahl)
 03-08: "The Women of Qumar" (Story — with Felicia Wilson and Julia Dahl)
 03-16: "The U.S. Poet Laureate" (Story)

Carol Flint
 05-03: "Jefferson Lives" (Teleplay / Story — with Debora Cahn)
 05-11: "The Benign Prerogative"
 05-20: "No Exit" (Teleplay — with Debora Cahn / Story — with Mark Goffman)
 06-06: "The Dover Test"
 06-17: "A Good Day"

Allison Abner
 02-03: "In This White House" (Story — with Peter Parnell)
 02-12: "Bartlet's Third State of the Union" (Story — with Dee Dee Myers)
 03-05: "War Crimes" (Story)
 03-07: "The Indians in the Lobby" (Teleplay — with Kevin Falls and Aaron Sorkin / Story)

Gene Sperling
 03-03: "Ways and Means" (Story — with Eli Attie)
 03-12: "The Two Bartlets" (Story)
 04-09: "Arctic Radar" (Story)
 04-14: "Inauguration: Over There" (Story — with David Gerken)

John Sacret Young
 05-10: "The Stormy Present" (Teleplay / Story — with Josh Singer)
 05-22: "Memorial Day" — with Josh Singer
 06-07: "A Change is Gonna Come" (Teleplay — with Josh Singer / Story)
 06-19: "Ninety Miles Away"

Peter Parnell
 01-19: "Let Bartlet Be Bartlet" (Story — with Patrick Caddell)
 02-03: "In This White House" (Story — with Allison Abner)
 02-09: "Noël" (Story)

Michael Oates Palmer
 04-04: "Debate Camp" (Story — with William Sind)
 04-13: "Inauguration" (Story — with William Sind)
 05-05: "Constituency of One" (Story — with Eli Attie)

Paula Yoo
 04-07: "Process Stories" (Story — with Lauren Schmidt)
 04-15: "The California 47th" (Story — with Lauren Schmidt)
 05-04: "Han" (Story — with Peter Noah and Mark Goffman)

Rick Cleveland
 01-08: "Enemies" (Story — with Lawrence O'Donnell, Jr. and Patrick Caddell)
 01-10: "In Excelsis Deo" — with Aaron Sorkin

Felicia Wilson
 02-18: "Bad Moon Rising" (Story)
 03-08: "The Women of Qumar" (Story — with Laura Glasser and Julia Dahl)

Julia Dahl
 03-06: "Gone Quiet" (Story — with Laura Glasser)
 03-08: "The Women of Qumar" (Story — with Felicia Wilson and Laura Glasser)

William Sind
 04-04: "Debate Camp" (Story — with Michael Oates Palmer)
 04-13: "Inauguration" (Story — with Michael Oates Palmer)

David Handelman
 04-06: "Election Night" (Story — with David Gerken)
 04-19: "Evidence of Things Not Seen" (Story — with Eli Attie)

David Gerken
 04-06: "Election Night" (Story — with David Handelman)
 04-14: "Inauguration: Over There" (Story — with Gene Sperling)

Alexa Junge
 05-06: "Disaster Relief" (Teleplay / Story — with Lauren Schmidt)
 05-16: "Eppur Si Muove"

Bradley Whitford
 06-10: "Faith Based Initiative"
 07-11: "Internal Displacement"

Ron Osborn & Jeff Reno
 01-08: "Enemies" (Teleplay)

Pete McCabe
 02-16: "The Stackhouse Filibuster" (Story)

Nanda Chitre
 03-04: "On the Day Before" (Story — with Paul Redford)

Jon Robin Baitz
 04-13: "The Long Goodbye"

Alex Graves
 07-04: "Mr. Frost"

Writers
West Wing